The University of Agriculture, Peshawar (UAP;), is a research university located in Peshawar, Khyber Pakhtunkhwa, Pakistan. The university is ranked fourth in agriculture in Pakistan.

History
It was founded in 1981.

Academics

The academic programs are divided into five faculties, each headed by a dean:
Faculty of Crop Production Sciences
Faculty of Crop Protection Sciences
Faculty of Nutrition Sciences
Faculty of Rural Social Sciences
Faculty of Animal Husbandry and Veterinary Sciences

The university has three institutes: 

 The Institute of Biotechnology and Genetics Engineering (IBGE)
 Institute of Business and Management Sciences (IBMS)
 Institute of Development Studies (IDS).

Institute of Business and Management Science
Institute of Business & Management Sciences (IBMS) was established in 1998. Initially, only management science courses were offered, but now it also offers courses in computer science and information technology.

See also 
Agricultural Training Institute, Peshawar
2017 Peshawar Agriculture Directorate attack

References

External links
University of Agriculture, Peshawar

Agricultural University
Educational institutions established in 1981
 
1981 establishments in Pakistan
Public universities and colleges in Khyber Pakhtunkhwa